The 1915 Southern Intercollegiate Athletic Association football season  was the college football games played by the member schools of the Southern Intercollegiate Athletic Association as part of the 1915 college football season. The season began on September 25.

Seven out of eight newspapers voted the SIAA championship to the Vanderbilt Commodores. The Atlanta Constitution declared it a tie between Vanderbilt and Georgia Tech, which was then independent. However, Tech challenged Vandy's championship.

Regular season

SIAA teams in bold.

Week One

Week Two

Week Three

Week Four

Week Five

Week Six

Week Seven

Week Eight

Week Nine

Week Ten

Awards and honors

All-Americans

T - Bully Van de Graaff, Alabama (WC-2; PD-1)
T - Josh Cody, Vanderbilt (WC-3)
G - Baby Taylor, Auburn (WC-3)

All-Southern team

The composite All-Southern team selected by ten sports writers and coaches included:

References